The Handmaid's Tale is an American dystopian drama television series created by Bruce Miller, based on the 1985 novel of the same name by Margaret Atwood. The plot features a dystopian future following a Second American Civil War wherein a theonomic, totalitarian society subjects fertile women, called "Handmaids", to child-bearing slavery. The series features an ensemble cast, led by Elisabeth Moss, and also stars Joseph Fiennes, Yvonne Strahovski, Alexis Bledel, Madeline Brewer, Ann Dowd, O-T Fagbenle, Max Minghella, Samira Wiley, Amanda Brugel, and Bradley Whitford.

The series premiered on April 26, 2017, on Hulu. The second season premiered on April 25, 2018. The third season premiered on June 5, 2019. The fourth season premiered on April 27, 2021. In December 2020, ahead of the fourth season premiere, Hulu renewed the series for a fifth season, which premiered on September 14, 2022. In September 2022, ahead of the fifth season premiere, the series was renewed for a sixth and final season.

Series overview

Episodes

Season 1 (2017)

Season 2 (2018)

Season 3 (2019)

Season 4 (2021)

Season 5 (2022)

References

External links
 
 

Lists of American drama television series episodes
Episodes